Kraglin is a fictional alien appearing in American comic books published by Marvel Comics. Created by plotter Stan Lee, writer Ernie Hart and artist Don Heck, he first appeared in Tales to Astonish #46 (August 1963). He is a member of the Ravagers.

A version of the character named Kraglin Obfonteri, portrayed by Sean Gunn, appears in media set in the Marvel Cinematic Universe, including the films Guardians of the Galaxy (2014),  Guardians of the Galaxy Vol. 2 (2017), Avengers: Endgame (2019), Thor: Love and Thunder, The Guardians of the Galaxy Holiday Special (both 2022), Guardians of the Galaxy Vol. 3 (2023), and the animated series What If...? (2021).

Publication history
The character, created by plotter Stan Lee, writer Ernie Hart and artist Don Heck, debuted in Tales to Astonish #46 (cover-dated Aug. 1963). Kraglin is a A-Chilitarian, an alien humanoid and was introduced as a one-off villain that was defeated by Ant-Man and the Wasp.

After that single appearance, Kraglin returned in All-New Guardians of the Galaxy Annual #1 (Aug. 2017), by Chad Bowers, Chris Sims and Danilo Beyruth.

Fictional character biography
Kraglin is an A-Chilitarian from the planet A-Chiltar III and has the appearance of a furry, purple being with multi-faceted eyes. When they are in Greece, Ant-Man and Wasp investigate a monster attacking boats in the ocean where they run into a Cyclops that is being used by Kraglin and his fellow A-Chilitarians in capturing people for their plot to study the captive fishermen and sailors and take over Earth.

During the "Secret Empire" storyline, Kraglin resurfaces as a member of Yondu's Ravagers.

Powers and abilities
Kraglin's multi-faceted eyes enable him to see in multiple directions at once.

In other media

Television
Kraglin appears in the Guardians of the Galaxy episode "Back in Black," voiced by James Arnold Taylor. This version has a human appearance like his Marvel Cinematic Universe counterpart.

Marvel Cinematic Universe

Kraglin Obfonteri appears in media set in the Marvel Cinematic Universe (MCU), portrayed by Sean Gunn. This version is a member of the Ravagers, serves as Yondu Udonta's first mate, and has a human-like appearance. Additionally, Guardians of the Galaxy writer/director James Gunn has stated that Kraglin is Xandarian.
 Kraglin first appears in the live-action film Guardians of the Galaxy. He and the Ravagers track down Peter Quill for betraying them before joining him and the Guardians of the Galaxy to save Xandar from Ronan the Accuser.
 Kraglin appears in the live-action film Guardians of the Galaxy Vol. 2. After inadvertently inciting some of the other Ravagers to launch a mutiny against Yondu, Kraglin helps Yondu kill them before rescuing the Guardians from Ego. Following Yondu's funeral, Kraglin inherits his yaka arrow controller.
 Kraglin briefly appears in the live-action film Avengers: Endgame. He leads the Ravagers in helping the Guardians and the Avengers fight Thanos.
 An alternate timeline version of Kraglin appears in the Disney+ animated series What If...? episode "What If... T'Challa Became a Star-Lord?", with Sean Gunn reprising the role.
 Kraglin appears in the live-action film Thor: Love and Thunder. As of this film, he has become a member of the Guardians.
 Kraglin appears in the live-action television special The Guardians of the Galaxy Holiday Special.
 Kraglin will appear in the upcoming live-action film Guardians of the Galaxy Vol. 3.

Video games
The MCU version of Kraglin appears in Lego Marvel Super Heroes 2. He appears in the Guardians of the Galaxy Vol. 2 DLC.

References

External links
 

Characters created by Don Heck
Characters created by Stan Lee
Comics characters introduced in 1963
Marvel Comics characters